Edward Ambrose Hug (July 14, 1880 in Fayetteville, Ohio – May 11, 1953 in Cincinnati, Ohio) was an American Major League Baseball catcher. Hug's sole Major League appearance came in the second game of a doubleheader in Cincinnati on July 6. He was a local amateur catcher at the time and was called upon to relieve a fatigued Lew Ritter in the fifth inning. He walked in his only plate appearance. The game was called in the seventh inning, to allow the Brooklyn team to catch their train out of town.

Hug shares the major league records for the shortest name and the shortest career.

He is buried at New St. Joseph Cemetery in Cincinnati.

References

External links

1880 births
1953 deaths
Major League Baseball catchers
Brooklyn Superbas players
People from Brown County, Ohio
Baseball players from Cincinnati